Rhagastis mongoliana is a moth of the family Sphingidae.

Distribution 
It is found from China, north to Mongolia, Korea and the Primorsky Krai in Russia, and east to Taiwan and Japan.

Descritption 
The wingspan is 47–63 mm. There are two generations per year, with adults on wing from late April to August in north-eastern China.

Biology 
Larvae have been recorded feeding on Berberis, Cayratia, Impatiens, Polygonum and Vitis species in China, Cayratia japonica, Impatiens balsamina, Zantedeschia aethiopica and Parthenocissus tricuspidata in Japan, Impatiens balsamina and Galium verum var. asiaticum in Korea, Vitis amurensis in the Russian Far East and Cissus, Damnacanthus, Galium, Oenothera and Parthenocissus elsewhere.

References

Rhagastis
Moths described in 1876
Moths of Japan